Badminton was introduced and only played at the 1981 World Games. The badminton events of World Games I were held on July 25–28, 1981, at the San Jose Civic Auditorium in San Jose, California, in the United States. These were the first World Games, an international quadrennial multi-sport event, and were hosted by the city of Santa Clara. China, in its first summer multi-sport event since the 1936 Summer Olympics, competed in badminton only, winning four of the five gold medals.  Seventeen of the countries at these Games participated in badminton, making it one of the most represented sports. The players executive of the International Badminton Federation, Ciro Ciniglio, expressed disappointment at the lack of media coverage of badminton, saying, "We have many world champions competing here and ... were hoping all these great players would draw crowds. ... The United States over the years has had very good players, some of the finest. It was our hope to help the sport gain popularity in the United states by showcasing all this fine talent."

Medalists
Sources:

Results

Men's singles 
First round
Liem Swie King (Indonesia), bye; S. Egbeyemi (Nigeria) def. K. Zeniya (Japan), 15-1, 15-4; S. Modi (India) won by default over J. Sidek (Malaysia); R. Stevens (England) def. A. Salazar (Peru), 15-4, 15-7; Morten Frost Hansen (Denmark) def. P. Johnson (Canada), 15-3, 15-4; G. Valdez (Peru) won by default over M. Sidek (Malaysia); Stephen Baddeley (England) def. G. Higgins (USA) 15-7, 15-8; M. Hadiyanto (Indonesia) won by default over J. P. Baudoin (Belgium)
Second round
M. Hadiyanto (Indonesia) d. Stephen Baddeley (England); plus other matches

Women's singles 
First round
Jane Webster (England) d. U. Kinard (USA), 11-7, 11-6; A. Tokuda (sic) (Tōkairin) (Japan) won by default over J. Youngberg (Canada); Yun Ja Kim (South Korea) won by default over L. I. Ivana (Indonesia); C. Carton (USA), d. C. Blackhouse (Canada), 11-7, 11-12, 11-7; Y. Yonekura (Japan) won by default over A. Ghia (India) 
Second round
Sun Ai Hwang (South Korea) d. G. Edwards (Nigeria), 11-0, 11-1; L. Blumer (Switzerland) won by default over W. Carter (Canada); L. S. Yeng (Chinese Taipei) won by default over V. Wiharjo (Indonesia); Tōkairin (Japan) d. Webster (England), 11-7, 11-6;  Kim (South Korea) d. Carton (USA), 12-11, 11-1; Lene Koppen, (Denmark), d. Yonekura, 11-3, 11-3; Gillian Gilks (England), won by default over T. Sumirah (Indonesia); Zhang Ailing (China), won by default over S. Skillings (Canada).

Men's doubles

Women's doubles

Mixed doubles

References 

 

Sports at the World Games
World Games
1981 in badminton
1981 World Games